The Hospital Universitario La Paz, HULP, is a general tertiary hospital situated in the neighbourhood that takes its name from the hospital in the northern city district of Fuencarral-El Pardo in the city of Madrid in Spain. It is affiliated to the Madrid Regional Health Care System (Servicio Madrileño de Salud-SERMAS) a branch of the Commonwealth of Madrid (the autonomous region's executive administration).

The hospital opened in July 1964, being at that time the first modern hospital centre in the country. It was named to celebrate the 25 years of francoist peace after the Spanish Civil War. Today, it remains one of the largest hospitals in Madrid by number of in-patients (it serves a population in excess of 500000 people) and one of the biggest of Spain from the number of beds. Remarkably, it was named the best-valued public-owned hospital in 2018. Among its wards they are particularly renowned the ones devoted to Cardiovascular disease, Hematology, Neonatology and Organ transplantation. Moreover, the HULP coordinates a European Reference Network for pediatric transplantation, funded by the European Commission.

HULP's headquarters are concentrated in a campus at the northern end of Paseo de la Castellana avenue and comprises 18 buildings that forms three major separate hospitals: General, Children's and Trauma. Administratively, the HULP also includes the smaller Hospital de Cantoblanco and Hospital Carlos III. Hospital Carlos III houses the infectious diseases area and it is widely recognized by hosting patients of both Ebola, during the 2013-2016 West-Africa Ebola outbreak, and Crimean–Congo hemorrhagic fever.

After the opening (1968) of the Autonomous University of Madrid-UAM's School of Medicine close to the HULP campus, it becomes its clinical reference site. Many of HULP's practitioners also serve as Associate Lecturers at UAM.

Institute for Health Research

As at 2009, and following the efforts of the Spanish government to boost biomedical research,  Hospital La Paz Institute for Health Research (IdiPAZ) was constituted as a joint-venture among the HULP, its own Foundation for research and the neighbouring UAM. The institute has been accredited by the national Instituto de Salud Carlos III, a quality seal in Spain. As at 2019, it host more than 50 research groups in six strategic areas:
 Neurosciences Area
 Cardiovascular Area
 Infectious Diseases and Immunity Area
 Organ System Pathologies Area
 Cancer and Human Molecular Genetics Area
 Surgery, Transplant and Health Technologies Area

Apart from the excellence of its staff and the quality of their core platforms, IdiPAZ strength resides on the synergies with the hospital day-to-day work, the possibility of expedite clinical trials or dig in its vast archives for research data. IdiPAZ's researchers participates in hundreds of research projects funded either by the regional or national agencies, the European Union or several private philanthropic organizations. The institute itself is part of two EU-funded distributed research infraestructures (ERICs): EATRIS (devoted to translational research) and ECRIN (to clinical trials).

Taken together the IdiPAZ, the UAM's School of Medicine, the Alberto Sols Biomedical Research Institute (affiliated to the CSIC), the Instituto de Salud Carlos III main administrative and research campus (ancient Hospital del Rey: comprising CNIO and CNIC, among other institutes) and even the slightly far away Ramón y Cajal Institute for Health Research (linked to SERMAS' Hospital Universitario Ramón y Cajal) you can find in a couple of square kilometres the biggest biomedical and health research hub of Spain.

Redevelopment
As at 2019 the hospital is scheduled to be rebuilt, although retaining its round tower. A significant proportion of Madrid's population was born in the tower, which houses the hospital's maternity department, and the retention of the structure reflects its place in people's memories. Nevertheless, the tower will be re-purposed to host the administration offices. The rebuilding is intended to be done in the same premises and without closing or displacing the actual activities, constituting an important challenge.

References

Paz
Teaching hospitals in Spain
1964 establishments in Spain
Hospitals established in 1964
Rotundas in Europe
Buildings and structures in Fuencarral-El Pardo District, Madrid